Niphogenia is a genus of flies in the family Empididae.

Species
N. eucera Melander, 1928
N. turneri Wilder, 1981

References

Empidoidea genera
Empididae